Cussen is an English language surname. Alternative spellings including Cousins and Cussans.

In England, the name was first found in Norfolk, where Roger Cusin was listed in the pipe rolls in 1166. The name Cussen was brought to Ireland by the Normans in the twelfth century. Families bearing this name formed the Cuisin Sept along native Gaelic lines and became fully integrated into Irish society. Counties Limerick, Wexford and Cork were the main settlement areas. In North America, settlers using this surname or its variants include: John Cosins who settled in Maryland in 1683; Richard Cousin settled in Grenada in 1774; Edward Cousins settled in Maryland in 1774; and George Cousins who settled in Massachusetts in 1635.

The name Cussen may refer to:

Laurence Cussen (1843–1903), New Zealand surveyor
Leo Cussen (1859–1933), Australian judge
Cliodhna Cussen Irish sculptor married to activist and writer Pádraig Ó Snodaigh and mother of Aengus Ó Snodaigh
Michael Cussen (born 1984), Irish hurler

See also
Cousin (disambiguation)
Cussans

English names
Surnames